The 1899–1900 St Helens R.F.C. season was the club's fifth in the Northern Rugby Football Union, the 26th in their history. In their highest ever finish in a rugby league competition, and their most successful season, the club finished fourth in the Lancashire Senior Championship. In the Challenge Cup, St Helens were beaten in the first round by rivals Warrington. However, they did manage some silverware in the season, by beating league winners Runcorn 6-0 in the South Lancashire Cup final.

Lancashire Senior Championship

References

St Helens R.F.C. seasons
1900 in English rugby league
1899 in English rugby league